The Police Long Service and Good Conduct Medal is a decoration for police officers of the United Kingdom. First instituted in 1951, the medal is presented for twenty aggregate years of service in the police services of the United Kingdom.

Criteria
The Police Long Service and Good Conduct Medal was instituted under Royal Warrant by King George VI in June 1951 and is awarded as a mark of the Sovereign's appreciation of long and meritorious service rendered by members of the Police Forces of the United Kingdom. For an officer to become eligible for this award the Chief Constable must make a recommendation to the Home Secretary, and in doing so, is required to certify the following:
That an officer has been a serving member of a Police Force.
That the officer has served efficiently for the qualifying period.
That the officer's character has been very good.

Commonwealth
In 1956 eligibility was extended to police officers serving in Australia, Papua New Guinea and Nauru. In 1976 Australia replaced the award with the National Medal and, in 2010, with the National Police Service Medal.

Length of service
The initial award criterion was 22 years' service as a full-time regular police officer within any Constabulary. 

Later, Long Service and Good Conduct Medals were introduced for the Fire Brigade and Ambulance Service, both awarded for 20 years’ service.  A national campaign to award the police medal after 20 years, and so bring it in line with the other emergency services, was started by Warwickshire Police Officer Kenneth Fowler, supported by Chief Officers, the Police Federations and Members of Parliament. On 19 January 2010, Queen Elizabeth II amended the medal's royal warrant to make the qualifying period of service 20 years.

The Royal Warrant was updated in March 2022 by HM Queen Elizabeth II to award a bar to the medal ribbon for every additional ten years of service.  This change reflected the longer service of Police Officers following pension changes and sought to recognise their extended service.

Appearance
The medal is circular,  in diameter and initially issued in cupro-nickel, with modern strikings being rhodium plated. It has the following design:   
 The obverse bears the effigy of the reigning monarch 
 The reverse has the figure of Justice with scales in her left hand and a wreath in her right surrounded by the inscription 'FOR EXEMPLARY POLICE SERVICE'.
 The suspender is straight and found in both swivelling and non-swivelling formats. 
 It is engraved on the rim in impressed capital letters, with the recipients rank and name. As of circa 2006 officers from the 4 Welsh Constabulary’s have the option to have their rank engraved in Welsh. 
 Bars for additional service of 30 and 40 years, were authorised on the 11th March 2022. However officers had to be serving on this date, the award is not retrospective to officers who retired prior to this date.

Obverse variations 
The medal has been awarded with one of three obverse designs:

See also
King’s Police Medal
Special Constabulary Long Service Medal

References

Law enforcement in the United Kingdom
Civil awards and decorations of the United Kingdom
Law enforcement awards and honors
Awards established in 1951
Long service medals
Long and Meritorious Service Medals of Britain and the Commonwealth